Fifteen Songs or 15 Songs may refer to:
Rachmaninoff: 15 Songs, Op.26
Fifteen Hungarian Peasant Songs, a composition by Béla Bartók.